Gabrielle is a 1954 Swedish drama film directed by Hasse Ekman.

Plot
Bertil Lindström starts to work at the Swedish embassy in Paris while his wife Gabrielle choose to spend the summer alone in the Stockholm archipelago. She is very secretive about her past. He then starts to fantasize about all sorts of things she possibly can be doing separated from him, is she true to him? His jealousy and imaginative mind plays him all sorts of tricks on this theme.

Cast
Eva Henning as Gabrielle Lindström
Birger Malmsten as Bertil Lindström
Hasse Ekman as Kjell Rodin
Inga Tidblad as Marianne
Carl Ström as Tor Fagerholm
Karin Molander as Mrs. Fagerholm
Gunnar Björnstrand as Robert Holmén 
Åke Claesson as Malmrot
Oswald Helmuth as Jensen, bartender 
Gunnar Olsson as Engkvist 
Lars Egge as Flight passenger
Hanny Schedin as Newspaper woman

External links

1954 films
Films directed by Hasse Ekman
Swedish drama films
1950s Swedish-language films
1954 drama films
Swedish black-and-white films
1950s Swedish films